Mispila (Trichomispila) is a subgenus of beetle in the genus Mispila. It was described by Stephan von Breuning in 1939.

References

Insect subgenera